Old Offenders is a 1915 American drama film featuring Harry Carey.

Cast
 Harry Carey
 Claire McDowell
 Anthony O'Sullivan
 Charles West (as Charles H. West)

See also
 Harry Carey filmography

External links

1915 films
Silent American drama films
American silent short films
American black-and-white films
1915 drama films
1915 short films
Films directed by Anthony O'Sullivan
1910s American films